Eva Maria Evdokimova-Gregori (December 1, 1948 – April 3, 2009) was a Bulgarian-American Prima Ballerina Assoluta with the Royal Danish, Berlin Opera Ballets, English National Ballet and guest artist with virtually every major ballet company worldwide.

Early life
Born in Geneva, Switzerland to Evdokim Evdokimov, (1919-2008), a stateless Bulgarian father and an American mother, Thora Mary Hatten (1914-1991). Evdokimova, an American citizen from birth, began her ballet studies as a child in Munich. She later attended the Royal Ballet School in London, where she studied for several years under the direction of Maria Fay. In 1966, she became the first non-Danish dancer to join the Royal Danish Ballet, where she continued her studies under Vera Volkova.

Career
She graduated into the Berlin Opera Ballet in 1969, where she danced her first Giselle in 1971. She was promoted to prima ballerina in 1973, a position she held for 12 years. For many years she was also the leading ballerina of the London Festival Ballet (now English National Ballet), where she was chosen by Rudolf Nureyev to dance the first Princess Aurora in his production of The Sleeping Beauty with the company in 1975.

Throughout her career, she danced with virtually every major international ballet company including the Kirov Ballet, where she was coached by Natalia Dudinskaya, the American Ballet Theater, and the Paris Opera Ballet. She was frequently paired with Nureyev.  Their partnership lasted over fifteen years and they performed hundreds of times together.

After a performance with the Kirov Ballet she was awarded the title "Prima Ballerina Assoluta." Subsequently, she was billed that way internationally. In addition to her interpretations of the tragic heroines of the Romantic era, namely Giselle and La Sylphide, her repertoire encompassed about 150 roles ranging from classical to contemporary works. The last dance created for her (by choreographer Henning Rübsam) in 2002, prompted New York Times critic Jennifer Dunning to comment, "Both the solo and her performance were celebrations of the kind of artistry that comes only with maturity and experience."

The first American to win any international ballet competition,   Evdokimova won the Varna International Ballet Competition in 1970. She was awarded the charter Ulanova Prize in 2005 for "selfless dedication to the art of dance".

In New York she studied acting at HB Studio.

Later life
Evdokimova later became a dance teacher and ballet mistress at the Boston Ballet and judged numerous international ballet competitions. There are numerous clips of her performances on YouTube although not remastered.

Death
She died on April 3, 2009, aged 60, from complications of cancer in Manhattan, New York, according to her husband, Michael S. Gregori. She is survived by her brother Boris Santini and her husband, Michael S. Gregori, who during 2017 was left homeless after a legal feud with his mother and siblings forced him out of his mother's apartment.

Final resting place
As of 2019, the final resting place of her remains is currently unknown, according to the New York Post

References

Further reading
The Times "Eva Evdokimova: prima ballerina assoluta", April 18, 2009 
Dance Magazine, December 2005, interview 
Ballet Arts bio. 
Oxford Dictionary of Dance entry 
People, January 11, 1988, Vol. 29, No. 1
Portrait of an Artist: Eva Evdokimova, Dance Books, London 1982 

Prima ballerina assolutas
American ballerinas
American expatriates in Switzerland
American people of Bulgarian descent
Deaths from cancer in New York (state)
People from Geneva
People from Manhattan
1948 births
2009 deaths
20th-century American women
21st-century American women
20th-century American ballet dancers